Deh Lachin (also Romanized as Deh Lāchīn and Deh-e Lāchīn; also known as Deh Laki) is a village in Dashtab Rural District, in the Central District of Baft County, Kerman Province, Iran. At the 2006 census, its population was 51, in 10 families.

References 

Populated places in Baft County